lex Cassia may refer to:

lex Cassia tabellaria (137 BC) introduced secret votes in court jury decisions
lex Cassia de senatu (104 BC)  required any senator to be expelled from the senate if they had been convicted of a crime, or if their power (imperium) had been revoked while serving as a magistrate
lex Cassia (44 BC?) allowed Julius Caesar to add new individuals to the patrician (aristocratic) class
lex Cassia Terentia frumentaria (73 BC) required the distribution of corn among the poor citizens

Roman law